Ruan zha li ji is a traditional dish of Beijing cuisine consisting of pork tenderloin strips that have been soft fried.

Preparation
The traditional culinary method of this dish begins with the preparation of the main ingredients that include 200 grams of tenderloin, four eggs, 30 grams of cooking wine, 30 grams of flour, 10 grams of sesame oil, 1 kg of pork fat, and salt.  The tenderloin is cut into slices 4 cm long and 2 cm thick, and soaked in the mixture of rice wine and salt.  Egg whites are mixed with flour in a container to form a paste thick enough to keep a chopstick in a standing position.  Pork fat is heated and the marinated meat slices are fried for five minutes.  When the cooked tenderloin slices are ready for serving, sesame oil is added.

Due to the use of pork fat, the dish is considered unhealthy and the vegetable oil has been used as an alternative, but many have claimed that this results in the dish not being as tasty as when pork fat is used.

See also
 List of pork dishes

References

Beijing cuisine
Pork dishes